Guder is a town located in the West Shewa Zone of the Oromia of Ethiopia. Guder is famous for its Guder River Falls and year-round fruit production, using plentiful water resources in the vicinity.

Demographics 
Based on figures from the Central Statistical Agency in 2005, Guder has an estimated total population of 17,084 of whom 8,272 are men and 8,812 are women. It is one of five towns in Naannawa Ambo woreda.

The 1994 census reported this town had a total population of 9,562, of whom 4,486 were men and 5,076 were women. The five largest ethnic groups reported in Guder were the Oromo (83.79%), and the Amhara (12.34%); all other ethnic groups made up 3.87% of the population. Oromo was spoken as a first language by 79.15%, and 18.92% spoke Amharic; the remaining 1.93% spoke all other primary languages reported. The majority of the inhabitants professed Ethiopian Orthodox Christianity, with 86.96% of the population reporting they practiced that belief, while 9.39% of the population said they were Protestant, and 2.53% were Muslim.

Sources

Cities and towns in Oromia Region